Bowie Lam (Lam Bo-yee; born 4 September 1965) is an Hong Kong actor with the TVB network. He has starred in several popular dramas including File of Justice and Healing Hands.

Before working in entertainment, Lam held other occupations, including serving in the Hong Kong Police Force for a short time. He made his acting debut in 1986 in Kiss Me Goodbye and his singing debut in 1989.

Lam's acting career took off after joining the major television network TVB in 1991. His first project was a supporting role in the 1992 drama The Greed of Man, which starred Sean Lau, Vivian Chow, Adam Cheng, and Amy Kwok. The Greed of Man as of 2011 remained one of TVB's highest-rated dramas. After The Greed of Man, Lam was featured in TVB dramas File of Justice (1994–1997), Untraceable Evidence (1997 and 1999), and Healing Hands (1998, 2000, and 2005). His major break-out role is considered the 2004 War and Beauty, which was a huge success in Hong Kong and China.

Television series

Host

Filmography
 Kiss Me Goodbye (1986)
 People's Hero (1987)
 On the Run (1988)
 Give From Heaven (1989)
 Bachelor's Swan Song (1989)
 Doctor Vampire (1991)
 It's Now or Never (1992)
 Rogues From The North (1992)
 Now You See Love, Now You Don't (1992)
 Gun n' Rose (1992)
 The Sting (1992)
 Hard Boiled (1992)
 Once a Cop (1993)
 Man of the Time (1993)
 Rose Rose I Love You (1993)
 Cop Image (1994)
 A Fatal Jump (1994)
 Modern Romance (1994)
 Beginner's Luck (1994)
 The Most Wanted (1994)
 Those Were the Days... (1995)
 The Day That Doesn't Exit Part A... (1995)
 Heaven Can't Wait (1995)
 Faithfully Yours (1995)
 King of Robbery (1996)
 Wild (1996)
 Rich For One Night (1996)
 Passionate Night (1997)
 Lost Control (1997)
 Lawyer Lawyer (1997)
 Evil Instinct (1997)
 Oh! My God (1998)
 Hong Kong X File (1998)
 The Sniper (2009)
 I Corrupt All Cops (2009)
 Better and Better (2013)
 Caught in Trap (2014)
 The Crossing (2014)
 Massagist (2015)
 S Storm (2016)
 La Historia Du Un Amor (2017)
 Wait Here (2018)
 First Night Nerves (2018)

TV series theme songs
 "Unsuspectingly" (不知不覺), with Kit Chan, opening theme song for Healing Hands II (2000)
 "Love Does Not Leave" (愛不出口), insert song for Healing Hands II (2000)
 "Escape to Life Sky" (逃出生天), opening theme for Fight for Love (2002)
 "Cover Your Eyes to See the World" (闔上眼睛看世界), opening theme for Invisible Journey (2002)
 "Don't Fear the Dark" (不要怕黑), insert song for Invisible Journey (2002)
 "Split" (一字馬), opening theme song for Vigilante Force (2003)
 "If You Were My Lover" (如果你是我的愛人), insert song for Vigilante Force (2003)
 "Children" (兒女), opening theme song for War and Beauty (2004)
 "Arsenic" (砒霜), insert song for War and Beauty (2004)
 "The Eagle Soars" (飛鷹翱翔(完整)), ending theme for Always Ready (2005)
 "With You Every Day" (和你的每一天), theme song for Healing Hands III (2005)
 "The Wrong Gray Is Correct" (灰色錯對), opening theme song for Misleading Track (2005)
 "Intelligence" (情報), opening theme song for CIB Files (2006)
 "Wind Sand" (風沙), opening theme song for The Dance of Passion (2006)
 "The Two Words of Love" (相戀兩個字) with Gigi Lai, ending theme song for The Gem of Life (2008)
 "Sam Chung Yau So" (心中有數) opening theme song for Every Move You Make (2010)
 "Youthful Ignorance" (年少無知) with Moses Chan and Kenny Wong, ending theme song for When Heaven Burns (2011)

References

External links
 
Official Blog

|-
! colspan="3" style="background: #DAA520;" | TVB Anniversary Awards

|-
! colspan="3" style="background: #DAA520;" | Asian Television Awards

1965 births
Living people
Hong Kong male singers
Cantopop singers
Hong Kong Mandopop singers
TVB actors
Hong Kong police officers
Hong Kong male television actors
Hong Kong male film actors
20th-century Hong Kong male actors
21st-century Hong Kong male actors
Hakka musicians
Chinese firefighters